
Year 268 BC was a year of the pre-Julian Roman calendar. At the time it was known as the Year of the Consulship of Sophus and Russus (or, less frequently, year 486 Ab urbe condita). The denomination 268 BC for this year has been used since the early medieval period, when the Anno Domini calendar era became the prevalent method in Europe for naming years.

Events 
 By place 
 Roman Republic 
 The Roman denarius coin is minted for the first time.
 The Romans found a colony at Malventum which they, for superstitious reasons, call Beneventum (since male means bad and bene means good in Latin).
 The Romans found a colony at Ariminum.

 Greece 
 Chremonides, an Athenian statesman and general, issues the Decree of Chremonides, creating an alliance between Sparta, Athens, and Ptolemy II of Egypt. The origins of this alliance lay in the continuing desire of many Greek states, notably Athens and Sparta, for a restoration of their former independence, along with the desire of Ptolemy II to create troubles for his rival Antigonus II, King of Macedonia. Ptolemy II's ambitions in the Aegean Sea are threatened by Antigonus Gonatas' fleet, so he carefully builds up a coalition of the rest of the Greeks against Macedonians. He especially cultivates Athens by supplying the city with grain.

 India 
 Ashoka becomes emperor of the Maurya Empire.

Births 
 Fu Sheng (Master Fu), Chinese Confusian scholar (d. 178 BC)
 Li Yiji, Chinese politician and adviser (d. 204 BC)

Deaths

References